Frank R. Reid (April 18, 1879 – January 25, 1945) was an American politician and U.S. Representative from Illinois. He was christened without a middle name and chose the letter "R" for an initial.

Born in Aurora, Illinois, Reid was one of eleven children of an Irish grocery store owner. Reid attended the public schools, the University of Chicago, and the Chicago College of Law.
He was admitted to the bar in 1901 and commenced practice in Aurora, Illinois.
He served as prosecuting attorney of Kane County 1904-1908.
State's attorney 1904-1908.
He served as assistant United States attorney at Chicago 1908-1910.
He served as member of the State house of representatives in 1911 and 1912.
He served as chairman of the Kane County Republican central committee 1914-1916.
Secretary of the League of Illinois Municipalities in 1916 and 1917.

Reid was elected as a Republican to the Sixty-eighth and to the five succeeding Congresses (March 4, 1923 – January 3, 1935).
He served as chairman of the Committee on Flood Control (Sixty-ninth through Seventy-first Congresses).
He was not a candidate for renomination in 1934.
He engaged in the general practice of law at Chicago and Aurora, Illinois.
He died in Aurora, Illinois, on January 25, 1945.
He was interred in Spring Lake Cemetery.

While serving on the House Aircraft Committee, he met Gen. Billy Mitchell, who was testifying before the committee. On October 3, 1925, he was requested by Mitchell to act as defense counsel during Mitchell's court-martial in Washington, D.C. for "conduct to the prejudice of good order and discipline," and represented him pro bono. In the dramatic film about the trial, The Court-Martial of Billy Mitchell, Reid was portrayed by Ralph Bellamy.

References

1879 births
1945 deaths
People from Aurora, Illinois
University of Chicago alumni
Illinois lawyers
Republican Party members of the Illinois House of Representatives
Republican Party members of the United States House of Representatives from Illinois